Udaykal (Thunder Of The Hills) is a 1930 historical silent film co-directed by V. Shantaram and Keshavrao Dhaiber. 
It was produced by Prabhat Film Company. The story was written by Baburao Pendharkar. The cinematographers were S. Fattelal and V. G. Damle. The film starred V. Shantaram, Baburao Pendharkar, Kamla Devi, G. R. Mane, Ibrahim and Dhaiber.

The film was the second of  two "significant historical silent films" made by Shantaram, the first being Netaji Palkar (1927). Udaykal was a historical film based on the "military expeditions" of the young 17th century Maratha Emperor Shivaji.

Cast
 V. Shantaram
 Baburao Pendharkar
 Kamla Devi
 G. R. Mane
 Ibrahim
 Keshavrao Dhaiber
 Anant Apte
 Rahim Miya
 Yaghya the Dog

Production
Shantaram stated that this was the first film which "politicised" the Maratha Emperor Shivaji. The film was earlier called "Swarajyacha Toran" (The Flags Of Freedom), but with the censors opposing the word "Freedom", which to them seemed "seditious" in the title, its name was changed to Udaykal. The censors had the producers make several other changes just prior to the release, one of them being the climactic hoisting of the "saffron flag" at Sinhagad Fort.

References

External links

1930 films
Indian silent films
1930s Hindi-language films
Prabhat Film Company films
Films directed by V. Shantaram
Cultural depictions of Shivaji
Indian black-and-white films
1930s historical drama films
Indian historical drama films
1930 drama films
Silent historical drama films